Afromynoglenes is a monotypic genus of East African dwarf spiders containing the single species, Afromynoglenes parkeri. It was first described by P. Merrett & A. Russell-Smith in 1996, and has only been found in Ethiopia.

See also
 List of Linyphiidae species

References

Endemic fauna of Ethiopia
Linyphiidae
Monotypic Araneomorphae genera
Spiders of Africa